Qari Shakir Qasmi (Urdu: قارى شاكر قاسمى), was a Pakistani Qāriʾ (a reciter of the Quran) known for his work on Radio Pakistan.

Background
Qari Shakir Qasmi was the host of the children's television program Iqra, which provided lessons and exercises on properly reciting and pronouncing Quranic Arabic. This program aired and re-ran on the Pakistan Television Corporation (PTV) from 1978 to 1985.  It was later hosted by Qari Waheed Zafar Qasmi (his younger brother), and thereon by Qari Khushi Muhammad. He also was the author of a famous book called Asan Qaids Dars-E-Qur'an which came with audio tapes for helping children to read along with proper pronunciation. Qari Shakir Qasmi was also the first person to recite the Quran in the United Nations.

Publications
 Asan Qaida Dars-E-Qur;an

References

External links
Recitation by Qari Shakir Qasmi on YouTube
Rare Live Tilawat at Bhatkal Camenity in 1987 by Qari Shakir Qasmi
Qari Shakir Qasmi | IQRA TV program | Pakistan Television Corporation 1979 Rare Photos

Year of birth missing (living people)
Living people
Pakistani Quran reciters
Recipients of the Pride of Performance